Stephanie Edmison (born July 12, 1987) is a professional squash player who represents Canada. She reached a career-high world ranking of World No. 63 in April 2012.
She won two medals at the 2011 Pan American Games, a gold in the team event and a bronze in the doubles event with Miranda Ranieri.

References

External links 

1987 births
Canadian female squash players
Living people
Sportspeople from Toronto
Pan American Games gold medalists for Canada
Pan American Games bronze medalists for Canada
Pan American Games medalists in squash
Squash players at the 2011 Pan American Games
Medalists at the 2011 Pan American Games
21st-century Canadian women
20th-century Canadian women